× Odontioda is a nothogenus of hybrid orchids, for plants produced by crosses between the genera Odontoglossum and Cochlioda. Typically they prefer intermediate temperatures, i.e. warmer temperatures than the mostly cool to cold growing parents, and indirect sunlight. Often Cochlioda noezliana (Oncidium noezlianum) is a parent that inherits orange or red color. A famous early breeder of × Odontioda was Arthur Elle at Wichmann nurseries in Celle (Germany).

References

External links

Oncidiinae
Orchid nothogenera
Historically recognized angiosperm taxa